The 1994–95 ECHL season was the seventh season of the ECHL.  Before the season started, the Huntsville Blast moved their operations from Huntsville, AL to Tallahassee, FL and became the Tallahassee Tiger Sharks and the Louisville IceHawks suspended operations.  The Wheeling Thunderbirds finished first overall in the regular season and the Richmond Renegades won their first Riley Cup, defeating the Greensboro Monarchs four games to one.

Regular season
Note: GP = Games played, W = Wins, L = Losses, T = Ties, Pts = Points, GF = Goals for, GA = Goals against, Green shade = Clinched playoff spot, Blue shade = Clinched division

Riley Cup playoffs

Bracket

First round

Quarterfinals

Semifinals

Riley Cup finals

ECHL awards

References
All stats come from Internet Hockey Database

See also
 ECHL
 ECHL All-Star Game
 Kelly Cup
 List of ECHL seasons

ECHL seasons
ECHL season, 1994-95